Kallambah Branch is a stream in Crawford County in the U.S. state of Missouri. It is a tributary of Crooked Creek. The stream headwaters arise in the Cooked Creek State Forest just north of Missouri Route VV and it flows to the northeast. The stream enters Crooked Creek just south of the community of Keysville.

The name Kallambah is derived from the surname of an early German citizen.

See also
List of rivers of Missouri

References

Rivers of Crawford County, Missouri
Rivers of Missouri